The Arizona–UCLA men's basketball rivalry is a college basketball rivalry between the University of Arizona Wildcats and the UCLA Bruins.

Series history

The rivalry dates from the first games in 1923, but the true intensity of the series would not occur until the addition of Arizona to the Pac-10 in 1978. Since becoming conference foes, the game is played typically twice per season. The Wildcats and Bruins have faced off 10 times in conference tournament games.

Before the arrival of Lute Olson at Arizona, the Bruins had won 21 of 24 games against the Wildcats. UCLA had been seen as the dominant college basketball program in the west, with few teams able to challenge UCLA for the throne beyond a few wins. The rivalry did not gather steam until Lute Olson's arrival in 1984, who compiled a 28–23 record against the Bruins during his tenure as Arizona's head coach.

Since then, the two schools competed for the Pac-10 (now Pac-12) Championship every year, with the two teams winning 23 out of the 31 conference titles, and 9 of 18 conference tournament titles. Arizona clinched their first conference title in 1986, when they won on the road at UCLA in Olson's third season. The UCLA-Arizona basketball rivalry is still seen as the match up of the two premier teams in the conference. Also, the performance of the two schools influences the national opinion of the conference.  Mike Montgomery, former head coach at both Cal and Stanford has stated, "...If those two are not good, the conference is not perceived as being good. People don't give credit to the schools across the board in the league."

Results

Ranked meetings 
Arizona & UCLA have played 35 games when both programs were ranked.  UCLA holds the overall advantage 20–15.

Notes: † Denotes game was neutral site

Notes

References

College basketball rivalries in the United States
Arizona Wildcats men's basketball
UCLA Bruins men's basketball